The Magellanic Cloud Emission Line Survey (MCELS) is a joint project of Cerro Tololo Inter-American Observatory (Chile) and the University of Michigan using the CTIO Curtis/Schmidt Telescope. The main goal of the project is to trace the ionized gas in the Magellanic Clouds using narrow-band filters ([S II], Hα and [O III]) and investigate the physical properties of the interstellar medium of these galaxies. Those emission lines are produced by different astrophysical objects and processes.

External links 
 MCELS web site
 Cerro Tololo Interamerican Observatory (CTIO)
 Astronomy Department, University of Illinois at Urbana

Astronomical surveys
Magellanic Clouds
University of Michigan